The 1910 Penn Quakers football team represented the University of Pennsylvania in the 1910 college football season.

Schedule

References

\Penn
Penn Quakers football seasons
Penn Quakers football